The Skinners' School (formally The Skinners' Company's Middle School for Boys and commonly known as Skinners'), is a British Grammar School with academy status for boys located in the town of Royal Tunbridge Wells, Kent, England. Established in 1887, the school was founded by the Worshipful Company of Skinners (one of the 108 livery companies of the City of London) in response to a demand for education in the region. Today Skinners' remains an all-boys grammar school, recently awarded specialist status in science and mathematics in recognition of these disciplines' excellent teaching. The current enrolment is 1119 pupils, of whom around 325 are in the sixth form. The first headmaster was Reverend Frederick Knott, after whom Knott House is named. The current Headmaster is Edward Wesson.

Skinners' boys generally take eleven General Certificate of Secondary Education (GCSE) tests in Year Eleven (aged 15–16), and they have a choice of three or four A-levels in the sixth form. An Office for Standards in Education, Children's Services and Skills (Ofsted) inspection in 2007 graded The Skinners' School as "outstanding". The majority of students go on to higher education following the completion of their A-levels at the end of Year Thirteen (aged 17–18), and in 2011 and 2022, one in ten Year 13 students gained an Oxbridge offer.

History

Foundation 

The first school to be associated with Worshipful Company of Skinners was Tonbridge School. This 'Free Grammar School' was founded in 1553 by Andrew Judde a wealthy London fur trader and native of Tonbridge. On his death governance of the school passed to the Skinners Company where he had been Master for many years. Subsequently, the Skinners Company, like many other City Guilds, took an active interest in supporting education. For many years this took the form of charitable grants and scholarships. However, by the late nineteenth century, there was rising pressure to expand educational provision beyond that currently provided by the existing 'endowed schools' like Tonbridge and the relatively basic, local 'state national schools'. Skinners Company proposals for a second school "at Tonbridge or at some adjacent locality" first emerged in 1870, and after a prolonged row between the two towns Royal Tunbridge Wells was chosen as the location.

The school opened in October 1887 with 53 boys, many of whom had to walk in excess of six miles to reach class each day. Skinners was maintained as a day school until 1894 when the governors allowed borders to be taken on the understanding that the total number would not exceed 50. Soon after the introduction of boarders, the first House system was created with boarders allocated to 'School House', pupils coming in from the surrounding countryside making up 'Weald House', and those living within the town divided between 'East House' and 'West House'. Skinners has always been a selective school with entrance examinations held from the very first year in 1887 through to 1945 when the Eleven-Plus Examination was first introduced.  Until the late 1940s Skinners was also a fee-paying school. An advert for the school in 1895 stated: "The School Fee for Day Boys, which includes tuition, books, stationary and games for boys under 11, £2 18s 4d a term, and for boys over 11, £3 10s a term".

Related Skinners Company Schools 
The citizens of Tonbridge, angry at the neglect of their sons, encouraged The company to found a third school in 1888 – Sir Andrew Judd's Commercial School – which is now The Judd School. Finally, in the 1890s, The Company opened a girls school in Hackney, London, called The Skinners' Company's School for Girls.

The First World War 
The School's Cadet Corps (originally referred to as the Officer Training Corps or OTC) was created in 1900. When the First World War broke out in 1914 a high proportion of these cadets joined the army as junior officers. Many joined the Queen's Own Royal West Kent Regiment which was the most closely affiliated with the Skinners' OTC, but there was also widespread school representation across many other army regiments, the navy and Royal Flying Corps, predecessor to the RAF. By the end of the war 522 Skinners' School Masters and Old Boys had served in the Armed Forces (roughly 40% of the 1200 boys who had attended the school since its foundation). Of these 89 are commemorated on the Memorial at the back of the Old School Hall having paid the ultimate sacrifice for serving their country.

The Second World War 
Following the outbreak of the Second World War in 1939 the pupils of Colfe's School were evacuated from Lewisham to Tunbridge Wells and shared the Skinners' School premises for three years. Skinners' boys were taught in the mornings, Colfe's in the afternoons. The air aid shelters that were dug beneath the school still exist, but remain closed to the boys of the school. While the total number serving in the forces appears to be unrecorded, it is known that 61 Masters and Old Boys died, and are recorded alongside those from the First World War on the School memorial.

From fee-paying school to state grammar 
The Skinners School, along with the Judd School, Tunbridge Wells Girls Grammar and Tonbridge Girls Grammar, became 'free' voluntary-aided state Grammar Schools in 1948 following the 1944 Education Act. This act introduced the Tripartite System defining three different types of secondary school: grammar schools, secondary technical schools and secondary modern schools.

Recent developments 
The school has expanded and evolved over the years. On 1 April 1992, The school (formerly a voluntary aided grammar school) became a grant maintained school, reverting to voluntary aided status again in 1998, following the Education Reform Act of that year. Recently, additional accommodation has been provided for purpose-designed design and technology facilities and classrooms; a modern languages centre was completed in 2002 and a new music and performing arts centre opened in 2003. Ongoing development of the latter will provide further valuable provision for both curricular and extracurricular activities. Recent refurbishments have included new facilities for the sixth form. Specialist science status was awarded in 2005, which resulted in refurbishment of the science block. The school has since also gained mathematics and computing specialism status, and also achieved the 'green flag' status as an ecoschool five times. The school won a prestigious teaching award in 2009 in recognition of the work completed concerning environmental sustainability. On 1 February 2014 the school converted to academy status.

A full program of team games is maintained throughout the year with notable successes, particularly in rugby, cricket and athletics. The school enjoys a deep rivalry with The Judd School (with the annual rugby fixture being referred to as "Juddment Day") and, to a lesser extent, with Tonbridge School and Tunbridge Wells Grammar School For Boys.

Buildings and Property

The school consists of a range of buildings built at various stages of the school's history. While each building services specific departments, these have changed as new building/facilities became available:

The Old School Hall (1887) 
The red-brick, Early English Gothic building facing St.Johns Road is the oldest building on the main school site. The architect, E.H. Burnell had previously designed the front-facing buildings of Tonbridge School in a similar Gothic style. The main building is entered via heavy wooden doors, and a gothic stone, entrance hall, overlooked by an oriel window, designed to provide the original headmaster with a full right and left view from his office.

The main hall is buttressed with brick and stone piers, and well lit with fourteen stone traceried windows. On the inside the central hall is 170 ft by 30 ft long, with a "noiseless" wood block floor, carved corbels along the walls and a moulded timber roof. In 1903 the School acquired a magnificent organ from St. Johns Church, which still takes pride of place, alongside a narrow stage. In this room the Skinners' School morning assembly took place for over 70 years until the building of the 'New Wing' in 1960. To the left of the entrance is the main staff room. From the entrance hall, stairs run up to a gallery overlooking the main hall, which was dubbed the Bab-el-Mandeb Straits by the boys in early days, as it defined the 'dangerous' narrow passage leading to the headmaster's office (now the Bursar's Office). To the right of this gallery are two classrooms, where the Old Library once stood.

Further up the clock tower is the CCF HQ, which used to be the home of the music department, but this moved once more extensive facilities became available.

The southern end of the Old School Hall now houses the art department, following the relocation of the English department to the newly constructed Mitchell Building.

Beneath, and to the back of the main hall there used to be a covered playground, the scene of many early, break-time, football matches, now reassigned as toilet facilities. Buildings move on, not always for the better, however practical the need.

The School House (1887)  
The School House was originally built as the Headmaster's residence, but given its commodious proportions, it soon doubled up as a boarding house for close to a dozen boys. It now contains administrative offices including the school reception, headmaster's and deputy headmaster's offices.

Byng Hall (1900)
While the School did not acquire Byng Hall until 2003 the School had been a close supporter of St. John's Church Institute, who originally took residence in the Hall from its inauguration in 1900. Byng Hall was named after Lady Byng whose generous financial contribution had enabled the Hall to be built. Lady Byng was a direct descendant of the infamous Admiral John Byng who'd been executed in 1757 for allowing the French to take Minorca. He was a scapegoat and everyone knew it. Voltaire made a wry reference to Byng's execution in Candide, commenting that: "in this country, it is good to kill an admiral from time to time, in order to encourage the others". Given this historic injustice it was fitting that the Hall should be officially opened by another more celebrated Admiral, Charles Davis Lucas, the very first recipient of the Victoria Cross. As a young midshipman, Lucas had saved many lives though his courage and quick thinking. During the Crimean War a live shell had landed on the deck of his ship in the midst of a fierce artillery exchange with the Russians. Lucas ignored the desperate cries to take cover. Instead of hitting the deck, he ran forward, picked up the still fizzing shell, carried it to the rail and dropped it overboard a fraction of a second before it exploded with a tremendous roar. He later married Lady Byng's niece, and was no doubt more than happy to play his part in restoring the good name of the family. It fell to Skinners' first headmaster Reverend Frederick Knott to lead the vote of thanks for Admiral Lucas' heroism and the Byng family's generosity in funding the building of the Hall.

Originally the St John's Church Institute and later part of St John's Primary School, the governors of Skinners' had been hoping to purchase it for many years. It is stylistically very similar to the Main Building and School House and is viable from the front of the school plot.

Skinners' received grants from central government and ran an appeal in school and through the old boys network to raise the funds for the buildings purchase and renovation. The final building received a conservation award from the Tunbridge Wells Civic Society for the sensitive restoration which now enables Byng Hall to be used by the music and drama department; school drama productions and music recitals in The Thomson Theatre are prominent features in the school calendar.

The Old Gym (1900) 
The original School Gymnasium was constructed in 1900. It became too small to meet the sporting needs of the pupils and so temporarily acted as a careers office and gallery room for the art department. Until its demolition, the old changing area served as the headquarters and equipment stores for the CCF. The gym area became a new sixth form study area/common room with recreational seating and computers available to sixth form students during break/lunchtime, free periods and before/after school. There had been plans for a while to convert the old gym into an "Expressive Arts Building" with classrooms for the English department, a library and a large area for the sixth form. Eventually this came to fruition with the demolition of the Old Gym and construction of the Mitchell Building in its place.

The New Wing (1960) 
Due to its stark architecture, the concrete building is most out of place within the school and is often ironically referred to as The 'New' Wing. It contains the physics and chemistry laboratories and more recently now serves the biology laboratories. The laboratories were completely renovated on the school being awarded special science status in 2005 which prompted the biology department's move. New Wing also contained sixth form facilities until recently and the dining hall, which contains the canteen and is where whole school assembly is held before lessons every Monday morning.

The Knox Wing (1980) 
The Knox Wing contains 8 class rooms each of very similar appearance. These rooms serve as form rooms and also class rooms for economics, geography, history, religious studies and Politics.

The Leopard Building (1994)
The Leopard Building contains dedicated rooms for art and design/technology. Recently it has become home to IT rooms and the other class rooms serve as form rooms and rooms for mathematics. In 2010 the design technology rooms were upgraded to include facilities for delivering food technology.

The Cecil Beeby Building (2002)
The Cecil Beeby Building named after one of Skinners' School's long-serving headmasters, provides dedicated resources for the modern foreign language department and also provides form rooms. It was built on the site of two old cabins where German used to be taught.

The New Sports Hall (2012)
The New Sports Hall was officially opened by the Chair of the Governing Body on 9 November 2012. Inside the main hall can accommodate four badminton courts, five a side football, basketball, hockey training and cricket practice nets. At the far end it holds a large indoor climbing wall and upstairs houses a state of the art fitness suite, dance studio and classroom.

The Mitchell Building (2020)
The Mitchell building is the most recent addition to the Skinners’ School site and contains the new sixth form common room; the Sinfield English Department, with five classrooms; and the New Library. The building is constructed with a red brick exterior. It has been nominated for two architecture awards.

Southfields
Skinners' owns a large set of playing fields just along the main road that runs outside the school on the border of Tunbridge Wells and Southborough. Called Southfields, it was originally intended to be the site for the new school when plans were drafted in the 1930s. World War II prevented the move from occurring, but the foundations for the buildings are still present in one corner.

The fields are home to five rugby pitches, a football pitch, cricket nets, three cricket squares and various athletics facilities. The pavilion, featuring three changing rooms, was rebuilt in 2005 following an arson attack.

Form System
Each year group at the school is divided into forms. In years 7 through 9 there are five forms, organised by house as assigned to the pupils on entering the school. In years 10 and 11 (KS5) the pupils are reorganised into six form groups, numbered 1 though 6. In years 10 and 11 there are separate teaching groups for the GCSE subjects that differ from the forms. In the sixth form there are six form groups in each year, which are only used for registration and are not related to the students’ A-Level choices.

Houses
All students are assigned a house on entering the school. The five houses of Skinners' are named after notable contributors to the school, each designated a colour which determines the colour of the trim on the school blazers, caps and scarves worn by the pupils, as well as athletics kits. While the house only initially determines which form the student is in (this was not the case for the years starting in September 2013 – 2016 as there were five forms), it forms the basis of sport teams throughout each pupil's career at the school. As such, friendly rivalries exist between each house especially amongst cricket, hockey and rugby teams, with competition peaking at sports day. In the year starting September 2017, a fifth house was introduced, named Nicholson, after the first student to join the school. The fifth house was introduced because the school takes five forms in every year (instead of four, which was the case until September 2013) and wanted to return to the system where the forms in years 7 to 9 are based on house. The aptly named Charles Nicholson opened the house, as the first House Captain of the new house – migrating almost 300 students to the new form. 
These houses are:

School uniform 
The Skinners' School has uniform requirements that apply to all boys at the school, including those in the sixth form. These requirements have changed over the decades.

Traditionally
Variations throughout each school year, although some traditions have been repealed:

Year 7 (First year) Black shoes. Grey socks.trousers White collared shirt. School tie (black, red, and house colour, diagonal stripes). Grey, long sleeved, V-necked, woollen jumper (optional in summer). Blazer trimmed with two lines: burgundy and house colour, with school emblem on the breast pocket.
Year 8 (Second year) Long trousers.
Year 10 (Fourth Year)

There was also the honours school tie for pupils who made an achievement for the school name, such as winning a local inter-school race. This tie was red, black, and white, diagonally striped.

Present Day
Years 7-10:
 Black shoes
 Black trousers
 White shirt
 School tie (with house colour)
 Black V-necked jumpers are optional
 Blazer (with house colour)
 School scarves are optional

Years 11-13:
 Black shoes.
 Boys wear either a black or grey suit.
 Boys in the 6th form may wear a white, grey or blue shirt.
 Boys in year 11 should only wear white shirts.
 V-neck jumpers can be worn as long as they are a suitably subdued colour with no logos.
 Those in the sixth form wear the sixth form tie (black and decorated with leopards) whilst boys in year 11 continue to wear the school tie.
 School scarves are optional

Sports Kit
PE/Gym Lessons
School white shorts
House T-shirt
White socks
Non-marking trainers

Games
Black and red reversible rugby T-shirt
School black shorts
Black socks with red hoops at top
Appropriate footwear for football, hockey, rugby or climbing.

Other ties are also available, however. Sporting achievements result in the presentation of school 'colours', a tie unique to the sport the achievement was gained in, which is presented by the headmaster in front of the school. The same goes for outstanding ability within the CCF. Prefect ties can be worn by the head boy, deputy head boys and senior prefects, as well as school and form prefects (These are black with horizontal red stripes).

Many boys have represented sports teams at county, regional and national level. Ties awarded to such boys are also accepted within the uniform policy.

Teachers wear smart-casual clothing, with university gowns only worn on Skinners' Day during the ceremony.

Sixth Form
The sixth form are provided with their own common room, featuring recreational seating and an adjacent study centre equipped with computing facilities. There is also a common room for prefects situated under the headmaster's office in School House. There is also a common room for Sixth Form English students equipped with computing facilities and recreational seating area.

The current head of sixth form is Mr Craig Fleming, the longest serving full time member of staff at the school.

Academic Performance
The Skinners' School performs consistently above average and was awarded a "1 or outstanding", from Ofsted inspectors, on 6 June 2007.

In 2016
A-Level
87% of entries achieved A and B grades (excluding General Studies).

GCSE
The vast majority of candidates achieved excellent grades, with 65% of grades being at A* or A.
The overall GCSE pass rate (5 A*-C) was 98%.

Headmasters
The current headmaster is Edward Wesson.

Past headmasters have included:

The Reverend Frederick Knott
The Rev. F.G. Knott was selected by the school Governors from over 80 candidates who applied to be headmaster of the new Skinners Company's Middle School for Boys. After graduating from Magdalene College, Cambridge he taught at Dulwich College for a number of years, before taking up his first role as Skinners' School headmaster aged 27. The following report on a speech he made at Skinners Day in 1900 provides a strong indication of the ethos he imbued the school with during its formative years.

"It was impressed upon them [the boys] the necessity of some relief from work and toil, and sports undoubtedly acted as such. It strengthened them, gave them a better constitution, and gave more power for work and better results. The School is not to be regarded as a place where many lessons were stuffed into their brains. It was a place where character was formed, where they learned to associate with friends and where they learned to be in sympathy with their thoughts and ideas. It was a preparation for a greater life."

Colin Ransford (1924-1928);
Lieut. Colonel Walter Bye (1928-1953);
Cecil Beeby (1953-1976) after whom the Modern Languages school block is named;
Gerald Taylor;
Peter Braggins;
Simon Everson
Edward Wesson

Student Leadership
In the summer term of Year 12, school prefects are selected. Leadership roles amongst the prefects now include the head boy, two deputy head boys, the chairman of the school council, the parents' association and Old Skinners' Society liaison prefect, two senior prefects and five house captains. Other school prefects are divided between the roles of duty prefect and form prefect.

There are usually approximately sixteen form prefects, who take responsibility for a year eight or year seven form, two to a form.

Boards in School Hall denote previous positions of importance including Head Boys and CCF Commanding Officers. Until recently boys who earned a place at an Oxford or Cambridge college would have their name added to the university honours board although that practice has now been ceased due to the volume of boys gaining Oxbridge places each year.

In recent years, enthusiastic science students in the sixth form independently took it upon themselves to write and distribute an online science magazine about topics that interested them.

Notable former pupils

The Leopard song

The Skinners' School, like many schools started by London livery companies, has a school song. The lyrics are by Percy Shaw Jeffrey and appeared in the school magazine December 1894, and are as follows:

1
Now hands about, good Leopards all,
And sing a rousing chorus,
In praise of all our comrades here
And those who went before us;
For to this lay all hearts beat true,
The gallant hearts that love us,
So fortune 'fend each absent friend
While there's a sun above us.
Chorus
Sing Leopards Sing (Breathe)
Floreat Sodalitas.
Little matter, well or ill,
Sentiment is more than skill,
Sing together with a will
Floreat Sodalitas,
'dalitas Pardorum.

2
The ivy climbs by brick and stone
About the buttressed Hall;
So memory weaves a charm to keep
Her servitors in thrall.
And whiskered leopards think with awe
Of Bab-el-Mandeb's Straits
Where in the days of long ago
They wrestled with the fates.

(Chorus)

3
Then here's a toast before we part,
"The School House by the Lew"
And may its friends be stout of heart,
Its enemies be few
So we will pledge our noble selves
To use our best endeavour,
That while the merry world goes round
The School may stand forever!

(Chorus)

Meanings in the song
The song contains two lines in Latin: Floreat Sodalitas and  'dalitas Pardorum. Floreat can be translated as "let [it] flourish" and Sodalitas as "fellowship" or "companionship";  'dalitas is a contraction of Sodalitas (in the same way that fortune 'fend is a contraction of fortune defend) and Pardorum is the genitive plural of Pardus, meaning "Leopard" (the school emblem). Floreat Sodalitas therefore means "Let fellowship flourish" and dalitas Pardorum is "the fellowship of the leopards".

" Bab-el-Mandeb's Straits" is the name former pupils used to call the passageway to the old Headmaster's office (originally in Main Building), after the infamous and dangerous strait connecting the Red Sea to the Gulf of Aden. The apostrophe and the "s" may be anachronistic (a grocer's apostrophe) or they may refer to the nickname of the first headmaster (Mr Knott) being Bab-el-mandeb. The name is Arabic for the "Gates of Grief" and the Straits are vital international shipping waters to this day. The Headmaster's office is now used by the librarian.

It refers to the choice confronting a boy when told to 'report to the headmaster', which was a daunting prospect in the past. Having climbed the stairs, the alternative to turning right and entering the headmaster's room, would be to turn left and jump from the balcony down into the main hall.

Students are told that The Lew, mentioned in the final verse, is a now submerged stream which ran alongside Somerset Road. It may also refer to a small suburb of the town next to which the school was built.

Variations
The original last line of the third verse was "The Guild' may stand forever". A long-standing tradition at the school is to elongate the s sound in the word "whiskered" to create a hissing sound. Over time, enthusiastic boys, partially spurred on by the semi-disapproval of the staff, extended the tradition to all words within the second verse. While the students are never encouraged or told of this tradition, it is passed down through the years by the older boys to those starting at the school, during renditions of the song.

In recent years (starting in the late 1990s) it became customary (at least at Skinners' Day rehearsals) to loudly and deeply shout the word 'breathe' after the first line of each chorus, as a tribute to a much-loved retired music teacher, Mr Tony Starr, who shouted the word during rehearsals to remind the student body to breathe at that point.

The song has another version written by Shaw Jeffrey who adapted its lyrics for his new school when he became headmaster for the Colchester Royal Grammar School.

Old Skinners' Society
Founded in 1890 by the Old Boys of the time, the Old Skinners' Society has four main aims:

 To promote, preserve and strengthen the ties of sentiment which exist between Old Boys and the School and to encourage the closest liaison between the Society and the School.
 To provide opportunities for Old Boys to keep in touch with their former school friends and with the School.
 To encourage the formation and activities of branches of the Society.
 To provide and promote financial and/or material assistance to the School.

On leaving the school the majority of leavers sign up to the society for life, making them eligible to attend the many social events the society organizes.

See also
The Judd School
Tunbridge Wells Girls Grammar School
Tunbridge Wells Grammar School for Boys
The Skinners' Kent Academy
Worshipful Company of Skinners

References

External links
The Skinners' School official website

Skinners School
Skinners School
Skinners School
Boys' schools in Kent
1887 establishments in England
Academies in Kent